There have been two baronetcies created for persons with the surname Reynolds, both in the Baronetage of the United Kingdom. One creation is extant as of 2007.

The Reynolds Baronetcy, of Grosvenor Street, was created in the Baronetage of the United Kingdom on 28 February 1895 for the prominent physician and neurologist John Russell Reynolds. The title became extinct on his death the following year.

The Reynolds Baronetcy, of Woolton in the County of Lancaster, was created in the Baronetage of the United Kingdom on 6 March 1923 for the businessman and Unionist politician James Reynolds. The second Baronet was Chairman of Combined English Mills (spinners) Ltd.

Reynolds baronets, of Grosvenor Street (1895)
Sir John Russell Reynolds, 1st Baronet (1828–1896)

Reynolds baronets, of Woolton (1923)
Sir James Philip Reynolds, 1st Baronet (1865–1932) 
Sir John Francis Roskell Reynolds, 2nd Baronet (1899–1956) 
Sir David James Reynolds, 3rd Baronet (1924-2015)
Sir James Francis Reynolds, 4th Baronet (born 1971)

External links
Short biography of Sir John Russell Reynolds, 1st Baronet

References

Kidd, Charles, Williamson, David (editors). Debrett's Peerage and Baronetage (1990 edition). New York: St Martin's Press, 1990.

Baronetcies in the Baronetage of the United Kingdom
Extinct baronetcies in the Baronetage of the United Kingdom